Events from the year 1943 in art.

Events
 January – After attending the Casablanca Conference, Prime Minister of the United Kingdom and amateur painter Winston Churchill produces his only wartime painting, a view of the Kutubiyya Mosque in Marrakesh, as a gift for President of the United States Franklin D. Roosevelt.
 January 5–February 6 – Exhibition by 31 Women is staged at Peggy Guggenheim's The Art of This Century gallery on Manhattan, New York.
 February 20 – The painter David Olère is arrested by French police during a round up of Jews in Seine-et-Oise and spends the rest of World War II in Nazi concentration camps.
 Spring – The first exhibition of collage in the United States is shown in the Daylight Gallery of Peggy Guggenheim's The Art of This Century gallery on Manhattan.
 September – Retreating German troops deliberately destroy most of the collection of the Museo Civico Filangieri in Naples.
 September 21 – German-Jewish painter Charlotte Salomon, in hiding in the south of France, is arrested by the Gestapo, ending the autobiographical series of 769 paintings Leben? oder Theater?: Ein Singspiel ("Life? or Theater?: A Song-play").
 November 9 – Jackson Pollock's first solo exhibition opens in the Daylight Gallery of Peggy Guggenheim's The Art of This Century gallery on Manhattan.
 December 9 – Willem de Kooning marries Elaine Fried in New York City.
 Filming in the United States of a version of The Picture of Dorian Gray uses an original work by Ivan Albright as the title picture.

Awards
 Archibald Prize: William Dobell – Joshua Smith

Works

 Constantin Brâncuși – The Seal (sculpture, Musée National d'Art Moderne, Paris)
 Paul Cadmus – The Shower
 Salvador Dalí – Geopoliticus Child Watching the Birth of the New Man
 William Dobell – The Billy Boy
 M. C. Escher – Reptiles (lithograph)
 Murray Griffin –  Roberts Hospital, Changi
 Barbara Hepworth – Oval Sculpture
 Edward Hopper – Hotel Lobby
 Dame Laura Knight – Ruby Loftus Screwing a Breech Ring
 Wifredo Lam – The Jungle
 L. S. Lowry
 Britain at Play
 Going to Work
 Waiting for the Shop to Open
 George Platt Lynes – Marsden Hartley (photograph)
 Piet Mondrian
 Broadway Boogie-Woogie
 Trafalgar Square (completed)
 Walter Thomas Monnington – Clouds and Spitfires
 Paul Nash – Landscape of the Vernal Equinox
 Felix Nussbaum – Self-portrait with Jewish identity card
 Arthur Pan – Winston Churchill
 Mervyn Peake
 The Evolution of the Cathode Ray (Radiolocation) Tube
 Glass-blowers 'Gathering' from the Furnace
 Jackson Pollock – 
Mural (for Peggy Guggenheim)
Guardians of the Secret
 Norman Rockwell – Four Freedoms (paintings)
 Walter Russell – Four Freedoms Monument
 Xul Solar – Fiordo
 Dorothea Tanning – Eine kleine Nachtmusik
 Edward Wadsworth – Top of the World
 Stanley Warren – Changi Murals
 U Wisara Monument (Rangoon)
 Andrew Wyeth – Public Sale

Births
 January 8 – Sighsten Herrgård, Swedish fashion designer (d.1989)
 January 20 – Jessica Rawson, English art historian 
 February 22 – Dragoš Kalajić, Serbian modern painter (d. 2005)
 April 24 – Jüri Kerem, Estonian portraitist
 May 1 – Judith Scott, American outsider fiber sculptor (d. 2005)
 May 6 – James Turrell, American installation artist
 June 22 – Gordon Matta-Clark, American situationist, site-specific artist and performance artist (d.1978)
 July 15 – Michael Asher, American conceptual artist and installation artist (d. 2012)
 July 29 – Martha Rosler, American video, photo-text, installation and performance artist
 August 30 – Robert Crumb, American cartoonist
 September 5 – Jerry Wilkerson, American painter (d. 2007)
 September 17 – Gilbert (Proesch), Italian-born artist partnering with George (Passmore)
 October 1 – Sami Mohammad, Kuwaiti sculptor and artist
 November 11 – Dave Cockrum, American comic book artist (d. 2006)
date unknown
Alfredo Rostgaard, Cuban visual artist (d. 2004)
Tang Da Wu, Singaporean artist

Deaths
 January 13
 Xavier Martínez, Mexican-born American painter (b. 1869)
 Sophie Taeuber-Arp, Swiss geometric abstract painter, sculptor and dancer (accidental carbon monoxide poisoning) (born 1889)
 January 25 – Georges Picard, French decorative artist and illustrator (b. 1857) 
 March 8 – Alma del Banco, German painter (suicide) (b. 1862)
 March 9 – Otto Freundlich, German painter and sculptor (killed in Majdanek concentration camp) (b. 1878)
 March 12 – Gustav Vigeland, Norwegian sculptor (b. 1869)
 April 13 – Oskar Schlemmer, German sculptor, painter, designer and choreographer (b. 1888)
 May 25 – Percy Shakespeare, English painter (on active service) (b. 1906)
 June 28 – Pietro Porcelli, Italian-born Australian sculptor (b. 1872)
 c. July 11 – Friedrich Adler, German-Jewish designer (in Auschwitz concentration camp) (b. 1878)
 August 7 – Sarah Purser, Irish portrait painter and stained-glass maker (b. 1848)
 August 9 – Chaïm Soutine, Belarusian Jewish-born French painter (b. 1893)
 August – Adolf Behrman, Polish painter (killed in Białystok Ghetto uprising) (b. 1876)
 September 2 – Marsden Hartley, American Modernist painter (b. 1877)
 c. October 10 – Charlotte Salomon, German-Jewish painter (in Auschwitz concentration camp) (b. 1917)
 October 19 – Camille Claudel, French sculptor and graphic artist (in asylum) (b. 1864)
 November 13 – Maurice Denis, French painter and decorative artist (b. 1870)
 December 22 – Beatrix Potter, English writer and illustrator (b. 1866)

See also
 1943 in fine arts of the Soviet Union

References

 
Years of the 20th century in art
1940s in art